Burun is an ethnic group of Sudan and South Sudan. They live in and around the Upper Nile Valley in Northern part of Maiwut State. They speak Burun, a Nilotic language. This ethnic group numbers about 8,000 persons, according to 2008 South Sudan population census.
Generally speaking, Burun people inhabitanted   the areas present of Dajo, Pacime, Waldese and Kigile in Maiwut State....one of the 32.

Society 
The Burun speak the Burun language; a language in the Nilotic language family

Ethnic groups in Sudan
Ethnic groups in South Sudan